Elisa Santoni (born 10 December 1987) is an Italian rhythmic gymnast.

Biography 

One of the veterans of the Italian group, she has competed in 3 Olympic Games, a member of silver medalist group at the 2004 Summer Olympics in Athens and the bronze medal winning group at the 2012 Summer Olympics in London. She also competed in the Italian Group competed at the 2008 Summer Olympics in Beijing which finishing 4th in the Group All-around. She was part of the 2010 and 2011 Italian Group that competed at the World Championships that won the Group All-around gold medal. Her teammates also won a pair of bronze medals at the 2012 World Cup Final in 5 Balls and 3 Ribbons + 2 Hoops.

Her teammates have included Romina Laurito, Marta Pagnini, Elisa Blanchi, Anzhelika Savrayuk, Andreea Stefanescu.

Detailed Olympic results

References

External links
 
 
 
  (archive)

1987 births
Living people
Italian rhythmic gymnasts
Olympic gymnasts of Italy
Olympic silver medalists for Italy
Olympic bronze medalists for Italy
Olympic medalists in gymnastics
Gymnasts at the 2004 Summer Olympics
Gymnasts at the 2008 Summer Olympics
Gymnasts at the 2012 Summer Olympics
Gymnasts of Centro Sportivo Aeronautica Militare
Medalists at the 2012 Summer Olympics
Medalists at the 2004 Summer Olympics
Medalists at the Rhythmic Gymnastics World Championships
Medalists at the Rhythmic Gymnastics European Championships
21st-century Italian women